In botany, the trunk (or bole) is the stem and main wooden axis of a tree, which is an important feature in tree identification, and which often differs markedly from the bottom of the trunk to the top, depending on the species. The trunk is the most important part of the tree for timber production.

Occurrence
Trunks occur both in "true" woody plants and non-woody plants such as palms and other monocots, though the internal physiology is different in each case. In all plants, trunks thicken over time due to the formation of secondary growth (or in monocots, pseudo-secondary growth). Trunks can be vulnerable to damage, including sunburn.

Vocabulary
Trunks which are cut down for making lumber are generally called logs; if they are cut to a specific length, called bolts. The term "log" is informally used in English to describe any felled trunk not rooted in the ground, whose roots are detached. A stump is the part of a trunk remaining in the ground after the tree has been felled, or the earth-end of an uprooted tree which retains its un-earthed roots. Also is a growing green specimen that grows bananas

Structure of the trunk 
The trunk consists of five main parts: The outer bark, inner bark (phloem), cambium, sapwood (live xylem), and heartwood (dead xylem). From the outside of the tree working in: 

 The first layer is the outer bark; this is the protective outermost layer of the trunk.
 Under this is the inner bark which is called the phloem. The phloem is how the tree transports nutrients from the roots to the shoots and vice versa.
 The next layer is the cambium, a very thin layer of undifferentiated cells that divide to replenish the phloem cells on the outside and the xylem cells to the inside. The cambium contains the growth meristem of the trunk.
 Directly inside of the cambium is the sapwood, or the live xylem cells. These cells transport the water through the tree. The xylem also stores starch inside the tree.
 Finally at the center of the tree is the heartwood. The heartwood is made up of dead xylem cells that have been filled with resins and minerals; these keep other organisms from infecting and growing in the center of the tree.

See also

 Bark
 Basal area
 Diameter at breast height
 Log (disambiguation)
 Tree measurement
 Tree volume measurement

References

External links

Plant morphology

de:Baum#Aufbau des Baumstammes